Kertok is a type of musical ensemble that consists of the xylophone played in traditional Malay functions/an instrument. Kertok is from Malaysia. This is musical ensemble from Malay Peninsula that consists of xylophones played swiftly and rhythmically in traditional Malay Functions.  

Malay culture